The London and North Eastern Railway used a few petrol and diesel locomotives.  These included the LNER Class Y11 petrol locomotives, the diesel shunters which later became British Rail Class D3/9 and British Rail Class D3/14 and the Kitson-Still steam diesel hybrid locomotive. During the 1930s, Armstrong Whitworth supplied an experimental 1-Co-1 diesel-electric locomotive and several diesel-electric railcars. In the 1940s, the LNER had twenty-five 1,600 hp main-line diesel locomotives on order. These would have been similar to the British Rail Class D16/1 and British Rail Class D16/2 but the order was cancelled after nationalisation in 1948.

Petrol railcars
The LNER inherited several petrol railcars from its constituent companies:
 NER petrol inspection car
 NER petrol-electric autocars (these were similar in body style to the Tyneside Electrics)
 NER petrol rail motor bus
 NER petrol autocar
 GCR petrol-electric railcar

See also
 GWR diesel shunters
 LMS diesel shunters
 List of British Rail classes
 Southern Railway diesels

References

External links
 Armstrong Whitworth locomotives and railcars

Internal combustion locomotives
Diesel locomotives of Great Britain